Mongeperipatus is a genus of Central American velvet worms in the family Peripatidae. The species in this genus are notable for their giant size (with the largest specimens ranging from 18 cm to 22 cm in length) and for the degree of sexual dimorphism that they exhibit in the number of legs: females have 37 to 41 pairs, several more than the males, which have only 32 to 34 pairs. This genus is viviparous, with mothers supplying nourishment to their embryos through a placenta.

Species 
The genus contains the following two species:

 Mongeperipatus solorzanoi (Morera-Brenes & Monge-Nájera, 2010)
 Mongeperipatus kekoldi González et al. 2020

References 

Onychophoran genera
Onychophorans of tropical America